Kamal Ahmed (born 9 September 1965) is a Bangladeshi Rabindra Sangeet (also known as Tagore songs) singer. He is currently serving as the Deputy Director General (Program) at Bangladesh Betar.

Early life
Ahmed was born in Pabna on 9 September 1965 to Kiam Uddin Biswas and Aziza Khatun. He has a son, Ahmed Rezwan Protik, and a daughter, Ahmed Rehnuma Prokriti.

Education
After passing HSC examinations from Pabna Edward College in 1982, Ahmed got an opportunity to study soil science in Dhaka University. The chance to study at Dhaka was the turning point for him to be associated with Chhayanaut, a cultural organization committed to build up music talents, especially those of Tagore singers. There he came closure to veteran Tagore singers like Wahidul Haque, Sanjida Khatun, Ikhtiar Omar, Serajus Salekin and others. He received lessons on classical music as well from Ustad Phool Mohammad. In his student life at Dhaka University, he was one of the members of Board of Directors of the DUCSU Cultural Team. He represented the cultural troops of DUCSU to perform Tagore songs at Kolkata University and Kalyani University in India in the 1980s. He was elected "Cultural Secretary" of Hall Union and won as the champion of cultural week of Shahidullah Hall, Dhaka University.

Career
Ahmed is the present President, of ``BCS Information Betar Officer's Welfare Association” He was the Former Secretary General of ``9th BCS Forum” (2016-2018 & 2018–2020). He was the former adviser (Barishal-2008), Vice Presedent (Khulna : 2005–2006) and Member of Board of Secretary (Khulna : 2003–2004) of ``Rabindra Sangeet Shammilon Parishad”

Prior to beginning his career in the Bangladesh Civil Service (BCS), Ahmed opted for the information cadre as his first choice, although he could have joined the administrative cadre. He joined Bangladesh Betar in 1991. To date, he has worked over 26 years in Bangladesh Betar and 3 years in Bangladesh Television. Having a master's degree from Dhaka University and professional training in mass communication, mass communication research, networking and programme development for electronic mass media, he is the current Deputy Director General (Program) of Bangladesh Betar.

Many of Ahmed's albums are based on Tagore songs, and besides performing on stage regularly on Bangladesh Betar and Bangladesh Television, and different other satellite TV channels in the country, he has performed Tagore songs in India, and Sri Lanka.

Ahmed performed Tagore Songs in India, Sri Lanka & Canada. He also performed at the Indira Gandhi Cultural Centre Solo Program& the National Museum Solo Program and the Rajshahi Betar Shilpee Shangstha Solo Program.

Ahmed also released Music Video Titled : Bhulite Parina Take (Modern), Bhalobeshe Shakhi (Tagore) Megh Rong (Modern)

Ahmed has traveled in Canada, Australia, New Zealand, Singapore, Zimbabwe, Sri Lanka, India, Nepal, United Arab Emirates, and Saudi Arabia on Professional assignments.

Performances abroad

Awards

 SAARC Cultural Society Award (2010) 
Bangabandhu Research Foundation Podok (2015).gg
 Adwaitia Mallabarman Award (2017), From Maharaja Beerbikram University, India.
Beer Shaheed Dhirendranath Dutta Award (2017), From Agartala, Tripura, India.
 FOBANA Award (2017), From Canada.
 Rajshahi Betar Shilpee Shangstha Shammanona 2018.
Jatiya Rabindra Gobeshona & Charcha Kendra Shammanona 2019
Akash Media Bhuban Award (2022)

Albums 
Shada Megher Bhela (2007) -Tagore Songs.
Nana Ronger Dinguli (2008) -Tagore Songs.
Poth Chawatei Ananda (2009) -Tagore Songs.
Falguner Dine (2010) -Tagore Songs.
Nishshobdo Charane (2011)  -Tagore Songs. (Mixed Album)
Godhuli (2012) – A Tribute to Kishore Kumar.
Kan Pete Roi (2013) -Tagore Songs.
Bendechhi Amar Pran (2014) -Tagore Songs.
Bhora Thak Smritishudhay (2015) -Tagore Songs.
Oadhora (2016) - Basic Modern Songs.
Gaaner Toree (2016) - Songs of three Poets.
Baluka Belay (2016)- A Tribute to Hemanta Mukherji
Nidrahara Rater Gan ( 2016)  -Tagore Songs.
Durer Bondhu (2016) -Tagore Songs.
Mohakabyer Kobi ( 2016) - In India - A Tribute to Father of the Nation Bangabandhu Sheikh Mujibur Rahman.
Ekusher Shwaralipi (2019) – Songs of Shaheed & International Mother Language Day
Neel Shomudro (2020) – Romantic Duet Modern.
Mohakabyer Kobi ( 2020) - In Bangladesh - A Tribute to Father of The Nation Bangabandhu Sheikh Mujibur Rahman.
Mohakobi (2020) - A Tribute to Father of The Nation Bangabandhu Sheikh Mujibur Rahman.
Prothom Prem (2021) -Tagore Songs 
Tomaro Oashime - A Solo Audio Album of Tagore Songs (2021)
Rajneetir Kobi - A Tribute to Father of the Nation Bangabandhu Sheikh Mujibur Rahman. (2021)
Smritir Shohore- Duet Modern Songs (2022) 
Tomay Gaan Shonabo - A Solo Audio Album of Tagore Songs (2022)
Srabonghonogohon Mohe - A Solo Audio Album of Tagore Songs (2022)
Janmobhumi - Patriotic Songs (2022)
Tumi Shondhyaro Meghomala - A Solo Audio Album of Tagore Songs (2023)

Documentary Film 
Kamal Ahmed, a documentary filmmaker, has directed and produced the film "Jatir Pita Bangabandhu," which explores the life and legacy of Bangabandhu Sheikh Mujibur Rahman. Ahmed took charge of the planning, research, and direction of the project, bringing his extensive expertise to the production of this important documentary. 

Ahmed has created a documentary film; Dhonir Oagropothik is a documentary film made to celebrate the diamond jubilee of Bangladesh Betar. The planning, research and direction of the film have all been done by Ahmed.

The documentary highlights the contribution of Bangladesh Betar to the country and the people during the war of liberation in 1971. is highlighted in the documentary.

Music Videos 
 Bhulite Parina Take – Modern
 Bhalobeshe Shakhi - Tagore Song.
 Bhora Thak Smritishudhay –Tagore Song
 Megh Rong – Borsha Biroho.
 Ekush Tumi Lal Potaka - Song of Shaheed and International Mother Language Day.
 Ekush Manei - Song of Shaheed and International Mother Language Day.
 Poloke Heshe Chole Jao - Modern.
 Bhalobashi Bhalobashi - Romantic Duet Modern.
 Shudhu Bhalobasha - Romantic Duet Modern.
 Roktakto August - A Tribute to Father of The Nation Bangabandhu Sheikh Mujibur Rahman.
Rongin Shondhya-Romantic Duet Modern.
Amar Porichoy- Duet Patriotic Poetic Song
Amra Dujon- Duet Romantic Modern Song
Bajrokonther Kobi - Duet Patriotic Poetic Song
Mohakobi – Song Tribute to Bangabandhu
ShwadhinotaTumi- Duet Patriotic Poetic Song
Eakti Manchitro – Patriotic Song
Prothom Kobita – Romantic Modern Song
Eak Mohakal – Romantic Sad Modern Song
Ekoi Brinte – Romantic Duet Modern Song
Ganer Desh – Duet Patriotic Song
Godhuli Ronge – Romantic Duet Modern Song
Pita - Song Tribute to Bangabandhu

References

Living people
1965 births
Pabna Edward College alumni
University of Dhaka alumni
Rabindra Sangeet exponents
20th-century Bangladeshi male singers
20th-century Bangladeshi singers
21st-century Bangladeshi male singers
21st-century Bangladeshi singers